Dusk for a Hitman is a Canadian crime drama film, directed by Raymond St-Jean and released in 2023. The film stars Éric Bruneau as Donald Lavoie, a hitman for the Dubois brothers crime gang, as he begins to come under pressure from detective Patrick Burns (Sylvain Marcel) to testify against his bosses in a police investigation, while simultaneously being asked to prove his loyalty to his boss Claude Dubois (Benoît Gouin) following a botched double murder.

The cast also includes Rose-Marie Perreault as Francine Lavoie, as well as Alexandra Petrachuk, Paul Zinno, Judith Baribeau, Gabrielle Anne Desy, Charles-Aubey Houde, Joakim Robillard, Benoît Brière, Charlotte Poitras, Alexandre Castonguay, Sylvain Massé, Jean Petitclerc, and Melissa Plante in supporting roles.

The film premiered on February 28, 2023, at the Rendez-vous Québec Cinéma, in advance of its commercial release on March 10.

References

External links
 

2023 films
2023 drama films
French-language Canadian films
Canadian crime drama films
2020s Canadian films
Films shot in Quebec
Films set in Quebec